Zaliothrips is a genus of thrips in the family Phlaeothripidae.

Species
 Zaliothrips abdominalis
 Zaliothrips citripes
 Zaliothrips imitator
 Zaliothrips longisetosus
 Zaliothrips luteolus
 Zaliothrips nigripes

References

Phlaeothripidae
Thrips
Thrips genera